Giancarlo Ghirardi (28 October 1935 – 1 June 2018) was an Italian physicist and emeritus professor of theoretical physics at the University of Trieste.

He is well known for the Ghirardi–Rimini–Weber theory (GRW), which he proposed in 1985 together with Alberto Rimini and Tullio Weber, and for his contributions to the foundations of quantum mechanics. He independently rederived, in a referee report to Foundations of Physics, the no-cloning theorem, before the works by
Wootters and Zurek and by Dieks in 1982,
but after the actual first derivation by
Park in 1970.

His research interests related to a variety of topics of theoretical physics, but focused beginning in 1983 mainly on the foundations of quantum mechanics.

Ghirardi was a member of the editorial boards of Foundations of Physics and Studies in History and Philosophy of Science. He was president of the Italian Society for the Foundations of Physics, of which he was one of the founding members.

The President of the Province of Trieste, Maria Teresa Bassa Poropat, conferred the Sigillo della Provincia di Trieste to Giancarlo Ghirardi for research and teaching, for his commitment to the promotion and development of physics in Trieste and for his intense and fruitful activity as the author of popular books and scientific publications.

In 2017, he was awarded the Spirit of Salam prize for his extraordinary contributions to the development of the International Centre for Theoretical Physics during its budding years, both at its scientific and organizational fronts.

See also
Continuous spontaneous localization model

Books

References

External links
 GianCarlo Ghirardi, Editorial Team member page at Quanta.
 GianCarlo Ghirardi at Google Scholar
 GianCarlo Ghirardi, The Information Philosopher
 AIPS Honours Ghirardi
 Profile, News from International Centre for Theoretical Physics (ICTP), Trieste, Italy

1935 births
2018 deaths
20th-century Italian physicists
Theoretical physicists
Quantum physicists
Academic staff of the University of Trieste
Scientists from Milan